The 1894 Wisconsin gubernatorial election was held on November 6, 1894.

Incumbent Democratic Governor George Wilbur Peck was defeated by Republican nominee William H. Upham.

General election

Candidates
Major party candidates
George Wilbur Peck, Democratic, incumbent Governor
William H. Upham, Republican, former mayor of Marshfield

Other candidates
Capt. John F. Cleghorn, Prohibition
David Frank Powell, Labor, mayor of La Crosse, Union Labor nominee for Governor of Wisconsin in 1888

Results

References

Bibliography
 
 
 

1894
Wisconsin
Gubernatorial